Cosmopterix erinome is a moth of the family Cosmopterigidae. It is known from the United States (Alabama and Mississippi).

Adults have been collected in April, June and August.

Description

Male, female. Forewing length 5.2–5.5 mm. Head: frons shining ochreous-white with greenish and reddish reflections, vertex and neck tufts shining greyish brown with reddish reflection, medially and laterally lined white, collar greyish brown; labial palpus first segment very short, white, second segment fourth-fifths of the length of third, white with a greyish-brown line dorsally and laterally on outside, basal one-third white dorsally, third segment white, lined dark brown laterally; scape dark brown with a white anterior line, white ventrally; antenna shining dark greyish brown, a white line from base to beyond one-half, at two-thirds an indistinct whitish ring of one segment. Thorax and tegulae greyish brown with reddish reflection, thorax with a white median line, tegulae lined white inwardly. Legs: ochreous-grey, femora of midleg and hindleg shining ochreous-white with some greenish reflection, foreleg with a white line on tibia and tarsal segments one to three and five, tibia of midleg with white oblique basal and medial lines and a white apical ring, tarsal segments one and two with very indistinct ochreous-white apical rings, segment five dorsally ochreous-white, tibia of hindleg as midleg, tarsal segments dorsally ochreous-white, spurs dark grey on outside, whitish on inside. Forewing greyish brown with reddish gloss, four rather broad white lines in the basal area, a broad costal from one-sixth to the transverse fascia, widening distally, a subcostal from base to one-third, bending gradually from costa in distal half, often more or less fused with the costal line and hardly noticeable, a slightly oblique medial from one-fifth to the basal protrusion of the transverse fascia, a dorsal from base to the transverse fascia, a yellow to yellow-grey transverse fascia beyond the middle, narrowed towards dorsum and with a small basal protrusion and a narrow apical protrusion in the middle, bordered at inner edge by two tubercular golden metallic subcostal and dorsal spots, the costal spot with a patch of blackish-brown scales on the outside, the dorsal spot further from base than the subcostal, bordered at outer edge by a tubercular golden metallic costal and a dorsal spot, the dorsal spot about one-half to twice the size of the costal, both spots opposite and inwardly edged dark greyish brown, a narrow white costal streak from outer costal spot and a white apical line from the apical protrusion, cilia greyish brown around apex, pale ochreous grey towards dorsum. Hindwing shining pale grey, cilia pale ochreous-grey. Underside: forewing shining pale ochreous-grey, the white apical line indistinctly visible, hindwing shining pale grey, whitish at apex. Abdomen dorsally shining yellow-ochreous, laterally shining grey, ventrally shining yellowish white, anal tuft white in male, yellowish white in female.

Etymology
The species is named after Erinome, a moon of Jupiter. To be treated as a noun in apposition.

References

erinome